is a Japanese actress and caster. She is represented with Amuse, Inc.

Biography
Itaya graduated from Kyushu International University Comes High School and Fukuoka Jo Gakuin Junior College.
She worked as an exclusive model for PeeWee in 1994.
In 1995, Itaya joined with Hanamaru Hakata (As Hakata Tsuruya at the time) and Otako Pū as South End×Yuka (stylized as SOUTH END×YUKA) and released the single "So.ta.i".
Co-starring with Kentarō Ōtani, she acting debut in the film avec mon mari, in which she won the Best New Talent award at the Yokohama Film Festival. After appearing in Perfect Love!, Itaya appeared in many television dramas and films.
On 22 February 2007, she married wardrobe stylist Hirohiko Furuta. Itaya gave birth to her eldest son in June 2008, and to her second son on 9 August 2012, and is  now a mother of two children.

Awards

Filmography

TV dramas

Variety, cultural programmes

Films

Japanese dub

Advertisements

References

External links
 
 
 
 
 
Yuka Itaya at the Kinema Junpō Eiga Database 
Yuka Itaya at the TV Drama Database 
Yuka Itaya at the NHK Archives 

Japanese film actresses
Japanese television actresses
Japanese female models
Actors from Fukuoka Prefecture
1975 births
Living people
Amuse Inc. talents
20th-century Japanese actresses
21st-century Japanese actresses